Tunisia competed at the 2012 Summer Paralympics in London, United Kingdom from August 29 to September 9, 2012. This was the nation's seventh appearance at the Summer Paralympics since 1988. The Tunisian Paralympic Committee sent a total of 31 athletes to the Games, 18 men and 13 women to compete in Athletics only.

Tunisia left London with a total of 19 Paralympic medals ( 9 gold, 5 silver and 5 bronze ).

Medallists

Tunisia finished the 2012 Games with 9 gold, 5 silver and 5 bronze medals.  This put them 14th overall on the medal list.  They were one of two African countries to finish in the top 20 countries by medal, with South Africa the other country in 18th position with 8 gold, 12 silver and 9 bronze medals.

Athletics

Men's track

Men's field

Women's track

Women's field

See also
Tunisia at the Paralympics
Tunisia at the 2012 Summer Olympics

References

Nations at the 2012 Summer Paralympics
2012
2012 in Tunisian sport